Sokolovica (Serbian Cyrillic: Соколовица) is a mountain in central Serbia, near the town of Prolom Banja. Its highest peak Sokolovac has an elevation of 1,260 meters above sea level.

References

Mountains of Serbia
Rhodope mountain range